Men's Football events were contested at the 1993 Summer Universiade in Buffalo, United States.

Women's Football events were contested at the 1993 Summer Universiade in Hamilton, Ontario, Canada.

References
 
 Results of The 17th Universiade '93 Buffalo: Football (universiade.fjct.fit.ac.jp)

U
1993 Summer Universiade
Football at the Summer Universiade
International association football competitions hosted by the United States
1993 in American soccer